Anthomastus is a genus of soft corals in the family Alcyoniidae.

Species
Species in the genus include:
Anthomastus aberrans (Thomson & Henderson, 1906)
Anthomastus agaricoides (Thomson & Henderson, 1906)
Anthomastus agaricus Studer, 1890
Anthomastus agassizii Verrill, 1922
Anthomastus antarcticus Kükenthal, 1910
Anthomastus bathyproctus Bayer, 1993
Anthomastus canariensis Wright & Studer, 1889
Anthomastus giganteus Tixier-Durivault, 1954
Anthomastus globosus d'Hondt, 1992
Anthomastus grandiflorus Verrill, 1878
Anthomastus granulosus Kükenthal, 1910
Anthomastus gyratus Molodtsova, 2013
Anthomastus hicksoni Bock, 1938
Anthomastus muscarioides Kükenthal, 1910
Anthomastus purpureus (Koren & Danielssen, 1883)
Anthomastus rylovi Naumov, 1952
Anthomastus tahinodus d'Hondt, 1988
Anthomastus zealandicus Benham, 1928

Anthomastus ritteri (Cordes, Nybakken, et.al, 2001)

References

Bioluminescent cnidarians
Alcyoniidae
Octocorallia genera